The Rotherham by-election of 24 June 1976 was held after the death of Labour Member of Parliament (MP) Brian O'Malley. Labour held on to the seat in the by-election.

Results

Aftermath
The result was significant as it meant that the Labour government retained a majority of one in the House of Commons. However although Labour had held the seat, The Glasgow Herald noted that the voters had sent the party a "sour message". In a seat that had been considered safe for Labour, their majority dropped by over 11,000 votes and there was a 13.3% swing to the Conservatives. Moreover, the reduced turnout was taken by the newspaper as suggesting some Labour supporters had failed to come out and vote for their party. The newspaper thought that the Prime Minister James Callaghan, would be "very concerned" by this fall in support and by the size of the National Front candidate's vote.

See also
1899 Rotherham by-election
1910 Rotherham by-election
1917 Rotherham by-election
1994 Rotherham by-election
2012 Rotherham by-election

References

Rotherham by-election
By-elections to the Parliament of the United Kingdom in South Yorkshire constituencies
Rotherham by-election
Elections in Rotherham
1970s in South Yorkshire
Rotherham by-election